Abe-Hayat is a 1955 Bollywood film starring Premnath and Shashikala in lead roles.

Cast 
 Premnath as Jalal
 Shashikala as Shehzad
 Pran as Aqeel
 Ameeta as Sabz Pari
 Helen as Dancer/Singer

Soundtrack
The film music was composed by Sardar Malik.

References

External links
 

1955 films
1950s Hindi-language films
Films scored by Sardar Malik
Indian black-and-white films